Bas-Sassandra Region is a defunct region of Ivory Coast. From 1997 to 2011, it was a first-level subdivision region. The region's capital was San-Pédro and its area was 26,440 km2. Since 2011, the area formerly encompassed by the region is part of Bas-Sassandra District.

Departments
At the time of its dissolution, Bas-Sassandra Region was divided into six departments: Fresco, Guéyo, San-Pédro, Sassandra, Soubré, and Tabou.

Abolition
Bas-Sassandra Region was abolished as part of the 2011 administrative reorganisation of the subdivisions of Ivory Coast. The area formerly encompassed by the region was combined with Fresco Department—which was carved off from Sud-Bandama Region—to create Bas-Sassandra District.

References

Former regions of Ivory Coast
States and territories disestablished in 2011
2011 disestablishments in Ivory Coast
1997 establishments in Ivory Coast
States and territories established in 1997